Westchester Mountain is a community in the Canadian province of Nova Scotia, located  in Cumberland County.

References
Westchester Mountain entry in Nova Scotia Geographical Names (Department of Service Nova Scotia & Municipal Relations)

Communities in Cumberland County, Nova Scotia
General Service Areas in Nova Scotia